Muhammad Hadi Fayyadh bin Abdul Razak (born 22 January 2000) is a Malaysian professional footballer who plays as a forward for Malaysia Super League club Perak, and the Malaysia national under-23 team.

Early life
Hadi was born in Kuala Lumpur, but raised in Tanjung Malim, Perak. He started his career as a ball picker on the sidelines initially when he was 8 years old.  His talent was noticed by Irfan Bakti when he made a high jump while picking up the ball that bounced out during the Sime Darby vs Terengganu match.  Starting there he was called to try his luck with Soccer kid.  When he reached the age of 14 he continued to get attention due to the height he possessed.  He has the characteristics of a striker and is suitable to play as a target man. He joined Malaysia Pahang Sports School by the age of 13.

Club career

Johor Darul Ta'zim
He made his first-team debut by coming on as a substitute on the 67th minute against T-Team (currently Terengganu II). He became the first player born after 2000 to make a competitive debut in Malaysian Super League. Hadi went to a one-week trial with Japanese J2 League club Roasso Kumamoto in early August 2018. On 2 September 2018, Johor DT confirmed that they have released Hadi Fayyadh because of his eagerness to go to Japan.

Fagiano Okayama
Hadi became the first Malaysian to play in the J2 League after he joined Fagiano Okayama on 21 December 2018. But he never made any appearances with the club.

Loan to Azul Claro Numazu
In December 2020, Hadi was sent on loan to J3 League side Azul Claro Numazu which was initially planned to end on 31 January 2022. He was injured during practice on 23 March 2021 and was diagnosed with anterior cruciate ligament on the right knee. On 23 July 2021, he returned to Azul Claro Numazu after undergoing medical treatment and rehabilitation with his original club, Fagiano Okayama. In December 2021, Azul Claro Numazu announced that Hadi's loan period will be extended until 1 January 2023.

On 21 April 2022, Hadi Fayyadh made his debut with J3 League side Azul Claro Numazu in a 2-0 win over Vanraure Hachinohe in the J3 League. Hadi Fayyadh made his team debut after got subs in 84th minute replacing Ryo Watanabe. He also officially became the first Malaysian to play in an official J League match.

Perak FC
On 13 January 2023, Hadi Fayyadh return to Malaysia and joined the Malaysia Super League club, Perak FC for ahead of 2023 season.

International career

Youth

Hadi is a Malaysian youth international. In July 2012, he made his first international debut for Malaysia U12 in International youth football tournament in Saitama, Japan. He was a member of the Malaysia U14 team in 2014 AFC U-14 Championship qualification that will take place in Myanmar in June 2013.

Hadi was part of the national team for the 2017 AFF U-18 Youth Championship that will take place in Yangon, Myanmar. He scored 3 goals in 7 appearances during the matches.  He has played in the final against Thailand which Malaysia lost 2–0.

On 26 October 2017, Hadi was selected to play in 2018 AFC U-19 Championship qualification in Paju, South Korea. He scored 3 goals in 4 matches which confirmed Malaysia under-19s qualification to the 2018 AFC U-19 Championship for the first time in 11 years after finishing as one of the five best group runners-up.

Hadi was named in the Malaysia under 19 squad for 2018 AFF U-19 Youth Championship in the Indonesia. He played every minute of Malaysia's campaign at the tournament, which Malaysia won the AFF U-19 Youth Championship.

On 15 October 2018, he was named in the under-19 side for the 2018 AFC U-19 Championship. He played every minute of Malaysia's campaign at the tournament, which ended with them eliminated in last place in their group.

In November 2017, Hadi received his first call-up to the Malaysia U-23 for the centralised training camp as a preparation for 2018 AFC U-23 Championship. On 29 December 2017, he was selected to play in 2018 AFC U-23 Championship in China.On 20 January 2018, Hadi made his first appearance for the Malaysia U23 came from the bench in the 67th minute in a 1–2 defeat to South Korea at Changshu Stadium.

Hadi was named in the 20-man Malaysia Squad for the 2018 Asian Games, in the Jakarta-Palembang, Indonesia.

Career statistics

Club

International Goals

Malaysia Under-19

Honours

Club
Johor Darul Ta'zim
 Malaysia Super League: 2017

International
Malaysia U-19
 AFF U-19 Youth Championship: 2018, runners-up 2017

Notes

References

External links
 

2000 births
Living people
Malaysian footballers
Johor Darul Ta'zim F.C. players
Malaysia Super League players
Fagiano Okayama players
Azul Claro Numazu players
J2 League players
J3 League players
Sportspeople from Kuala Lumpur
Malaysian people of Malay descent
Association football forwards
Footballers at the 2018 Asian Games
Malaysian expatriate footballers
Expatriate footballers in Japan
Asian Games competitors for Malaysia
Competitors at the 2019 Southeast Asian Games
Malaysia youth international footballers
Competitors at the 2021 Southeast Asian Games
Southeast Asian Games competitors for Malaysia